Turkey Run Wildlife Management Area, is located immediately north of Ravenswood, West Virginia in Jackson County.

The WMA is accessed from State Route 68 on the north side of Ravenswood.

Hunting and Fishing

Hunting opportunities are very limited by the small size of the WMA and the nearby housing.

Turkey Run provides fishing opportunities largemouth bass, bluegill, channel catfish, crappie, and stocked trout in the winter.

Camping is not available at the WMA.

See also

Animal conservation
fishing
List of West Virginia wildlife management areas

References

External links
West Virginia DNR District 6 Wildlife Management Areas
West Virginia Hunting Regulations
West Virginia Fishing Regulations

Wildlife management areas of West Virginia
Protected areas of Jackson County, West Virginia
IUCN Category V